In January, 2008 the BBC reported that Simba Makoni might be nominated to run against Robert Mugabe in the Zimbabwean 2008 presidential election.

Announcement
On 5 February 2008 Simba Makoni held a press conference in Harare where he stated that he was challenging Robert Mugabe to become the next President of Zimbabwe. Up to that point he had remained a member of the ZANU-PF politburo and the party's Deputy Secretary of Economic Affairs.

He told reporters, flanked by Ibbo Mandaza and Retired Major Kudzai Mbudzi:

Makoni said that he would have liked to run as ZANU-PF's candidate, but since he could not, he was running as an independent. He later said that his conclusion that political change was necessary was not the result of a "St.-Paul-on-the-road-to-Damascus awakening. This has been a continuum, incremental, things have been building up."

Campaigning
Running under the slogan "Let's Get Zimbabwe Working Again", Makoni's theme was Dawn, and this name was given to the organisation supporting his campaign, Mavambo/Kusile/Dawn. He adopted the yellow as his campaign colour. The colour represents gold and the wealth of Zimbabwe, reinforcing his focus on solutions to the current economic crisis. The colour also represents the rising sun and the dawn of a new Zimbabwe, anchored in the hopes and aspirations of Zimbabweans for a brighter future. His campaign logo appeared very similar to that of United States presidential candidate Barack Obama's.

Joseph Chinotimba, a notorious war veteran who led the violent invasions of white owned farms in 2000, threatened Makoni with violence following the announcement of his candidature. A leading figure in ZANU-PF, Emmerson Mnangagwa, told ZBC TV that by choosing to stand for a position when the party had already chosen someone to stand for that position, Makoni had expelled himself from the party. The Herald newspaper denounced Makoni as being a pawn of the United Kingdom whose candidacy was being used in hopes of splitting the ZANU-PF vote so that Morgan Tsvangirai of the Movement for Democratic Change (MDC) could win the election.

Speaking on 7 February, Makoni denied claims that he was a Western pawn or that he was being used by ZANU-PF itself to split the opposition vote. He also said that the ZANU-PF constitution did not provide for self-expulsion and that still considered himself a member of ZANU-PF until and unless he is expelled from the party through due process. Referring to support he claims to have inside ZANU-PF, he urged these supporters to "remain steadfast and not be intimidated". ZANU-PF spokesman Nathan Shamuyarira subsequently sought to clarify the matter by saying that Makoni was expelled from the party, in accordance with party rules providing for the expulsion of a member who challenges a designated ZANU-PF candidate in an election, and he said that anyone who supported Makoni would be expelled as well. Morgan Tsvangirai said on 11 February that Makoni was merely "old wine in a new bottle" and that he would not ally with Makoni for the election.

Mugabe spoke about Makoni's candidacy for the first time on 21 February, describing it as "absolutely disgraceful", comparing Makoni to a prostitute, and criticizing Makoni for what he considered a self-important attitude.

Endorsements
On 15 February, Arthur Mutambara, the leader of another MDC faction not led by Tsvangirai, said that he would not run for president and that his faction would instead back Makoni.

At the opening of Makoni's campaign on 29 February, former Interior Minister Dumiso Dabengwa and former Speaker of Parliament Cyril Ndebele were present to support him. Also present at White City hall where Makoni launched his campaign was Edgar Tekere who vowed to de-campaign Mugabe until election time.

Result

Simba Makoni received 8.3% of the vote in the first round.

See also
Simba Makoni
Arthur Mutambara
Morgan Tsvangirai

References

External links
Official website

2008 Zimbabwean general election